This is the discography for Dutch rock/metal singer Anneke van Giersbergen.

Albums

Studio albums

As Agua de Annique

As Anneke van Giersbergen

Collaborative albums

Live albums

Singles

Music videos

Other appearances 

Recordings of van Giersbergen's voice can also be heard in Raveleijn, a horse show at Dutch theme park De Efteling. The same theme was re-used in 2012 for Aquanura, a water show in the same theme park. In 2015 a new roller coaster was openened at De Efteling, Baron 1898, where recordings of van Giersbergen's vocals are used for the White Women (Witte Wieven) characters. Her part is prominently featured twice during the ride, but is not part of the soundtrack CD.

References 

Discographies of Dutch artists
Rock music discographies